The Remote Astronomical Society (RAS) Observatory, Mayhill, also known as the New Mexico Skies Observatory (obs. code H06) is a remotely controlled observatory hosted by the New Mexico Skies astronomy hosting company.

It is located 15 miles north-east of the Apache Point Observatory.

List of discovered minor planets

See also 
 
 List of observatories

References

External links
 
 RAS Observatory of New Mexico at CityProfile.com

Astronomical observatories in New Mexico
Buildings and structures in Otero County, New Mexico
Minor-planet discovering observatories